Fiona Nave is an American politician serving as a member of the Montana House of Representatives from the 57th district. Elected in November 2020, she assumed office on January 4, 2021.

Early life and education 
Nave was  raised in Laurel, Montana. She earned a Bachelor of Science degree in applied mathematics from California State Polytechnic University, Pomona.

Career 
Nave served as an operations research analyst and computer specialist for the United States Navy for 26 years. He has served as the chair of the Stillwater County, Montana Republican Central Committee since 2015 and was also a member of her local ambulance district. Nave was elected to the Montana House of Representatives in November 2020 and assumed office on January 4, 2021.

Personal life 
Nave's husband, Brent Nave, worked as an engineer for the Navy. They have two children.

References 

Living people
People from Stillwater County, Montana
California State Polytechnic University, Pomona alumni
Republican Party members of the Montana House of Representatives
Women state legislators in Montana
1954 births
People from Columbus, Montana
21st-century American women